Fleet Marine Force, Atlantic (FMFLANT) is an American maritime landing force that is spread across the Atlantic Ocean.  It is headquartered at Naval Station Norfolk and directs and commands all the subordinate elements of the Navy Expeditionary Strike Force and Marine Air-Ground Task Force components that follow under the 2nd (Disestablished and merged with US Fleet Forces Command on 30 September 2011), 4th, and 6th Fleet and the Marine Forces Command (MarForCom).  The Commanding General of Marine Forces Command is dual-posted as the Commanding General of the Fleet Marine Force, Atlantic. FMFLANT is under operational control of the Commander-in-Chief, United States Fleet Forces Command, when deployed.

Organization
Reporting directly to the Commanding General, Fleet Marine Force, Atlantic (CG FMFLANT) are the Commanding General, II Marine Expeditionary Force (MEF), the Commanding General, 2nd Marine Expeditionary Brigade (MEB), and the Commanding Officers of three Marine Expeditionary Units (22d, 24th, 26th MEUs).  The Commanding General, II MEF, exercises operational control over the 2d Marine Division, the 2d Marine Aircraft Wing, and the 2d Marine Logistics Group.

Hierarchy of Fleet Marine Force units

Naval Support ActivityNorfolk, Virginia

Marine Forces Command (MARFORCOM)

Marine Forces, South (MARFORSOUTH)

Marine Forces, Europe (MARFOREUR)

History
Advanced Base Force
East Coast Expeditionary Force

See also
Fleet Marine Force, Pacific (FMFPAC)
Marine Corps Forces, Pacific (MARFORPAC)
Marine Corps Forces Command (MARCORCOM) [formerly Marine Corps Forces, Atlantic (MARFORLANT)]

External links
http://www.globalsecurity.org/military/library/report/1989/SJH.htm
http://www.globalsecurity.org/military/library/report/1995/MJS.htm

Military units and formations of the United States Marine Corps

de:Fleet Marine Force